Marco Antonio Rodríguez (born 24 January 1994) is a male Bolivian racewalker. He competed in the 20 kilometres walk event at the 2015 World Championships in Athletics in Beijing, China.

See also
 Bolivia at the 2015 World Championships in Athletics

References

Bolivian male racewalkers
Living people
Place of birth missing (living people)
1994 births
World Athletics Championships athletes for Bolivia
Athletes (track and field) at the 2015 Pan American Games
Pan American Games competitors for Bolivia
Athletes (track and field) at the 2016 Summer Olympics
Olympic athletes of Bolivia